"Oh What a World" is a song written and performed by Canadian-American singer-songwriter Rufus Wainwright. It was released as the second single from Wainwright's third studio album, Want One (2003), released digitally via iTunes and 7digital in the United Kingdom on November 8, 2004. Promotional copies were also distributed to radio stations in an attempt to increase awareness of the song and album. The song includes several arrangements from Maurice Ravel's Boléro.

"Oh What a World" also appears on Rufus Wainwright: Live at the Fillmore, the bonus DVD that accompanies Want Two (2004), the repackaged double album released in the UK simply titled Want, and the 2005 compilation album Acoustic 05.

The song contains an interpolation of Maurice Ravel's Boléro, which premiered in 1928.

Track listing
UK digital single
"Oh What a World"

UK promotional CD
"Oh What a World" (album version)
"Oh What a World" (radio edit)

Personnel

 Rufus Wainwright – voice, orchestral arrangements
 Marius de Vries – piano, programming, orchestral arrangements
 Joy Smith – harp
 Nick Hitchens – tuba
 Isobel Griffiths – orchestra contractor
 Gavyn Wright – orchestra leader
 Alexis Smith – programming
 Simon C Clarke – alto sax, baritone sax, flute, alto flute, piccolo
 Tim Sanders – tenor sax
 Roddy Lorimer – trumpet
 Paul Spong – trumpet
 Annie Whitehead – trombone
 Dave Stewart – bass trombone 
 Maxim Moston – orchestral arrangements
 Chris Elliott – orchestral arrangements

Television performances
The Frank Skinner Show - November 4, 2004

Live performances
Nobel Banquet - December 10, 2022

References

2003 songs
2004 singles
DreamWorks Records singles
Popular songs based on classical music
Rufus Wainwright songs
Song recordings produced by Marius de Vries
Songs written by Rufus Wainwright